Specific identification is a method of finding out ending inventory cost. 

It requires a detailed physical count, so that the company knows exactly how many of each good bought on specific dates comprise the year-end inventory.  When this information is found, the amount of goods are multiplied by their purchase cost at their purchase date, to get a number for the ending inventory cost.  

In theory, this method is the best method, since it relates the ending inventory goods directly to the specific price they were bought for.  However, this method allows management to easily manipulate ending inventory cost, since they can choose to report that the cheaper goods were sold first, hence increasing ending inventory cost and lowering cost of goods sold.  This will increase the income.  Alternatively, management can choose to report lower income, to reduce the taxes they needed to pay. 

This method is also very hard to use on interchangeable goods.  For example, it is hard to relate shipping and storage costs to a specific inventory item.  These numbers will need to be estimated, hence reducing the specific identification method's benefit of being extremely specific.  Thus, this method is generally limited to large, high-ticket items which can be easily identified specifically (such as tract houses).

See also
 Inventory
 Weighted average cost
 Moving-average cost
 FIFO and LIFO

References

Intermediate Accounting 8th Canadian Edition, page 445, Kieso, Weygandt, Warfield, Young, Wiecek, John Wiley & Sons Canada, Ltd, 2007, 

Inventory